Tramea basilaris, also known as the keyhole glider, red marsh trotter, or wheeling glider,  is a species of dragonfly in the family Libellulidae. It is found throughout most of Africa, Arabia and in Asia. Capable of very long migration and nomadic flight, it reached Europe once, being recorded (a pair) at the island of Linosa, Sicily (Italy) in 2016 (Viganò et al. 2017).  Similarly, this species is able to use the trade winds to reach the Caribbean and South Americas, where it was caught in Suriname, "Guadeloupe" and "martinique" (Meurgey and Picard 2011).

Description and habitat
It is a medium-sized red dragonfly with extremely long anal appendages. It can be distinguished from other species of this genus by the two brownish black hind-wing patch surrounded by a golden yellow areola in the base. Female is similar to male; but yellowish in color. 

This species is found at pools, ponds, marshes, lakes and water tanks. Typical reproducing habitats are grassy marshes and ponds, but this species may be found anywhere during migrations. They are seen in tireless soaring flight in sunny days, sometimes in conspecific groups or in mixed groups of other soaring dragonflies like Pantala flavescens or Hydrobasileus croceus. It perches on exposed twigs; sometimes with the abdomen held downwards to balance in wind.

See also 
 List of odonates of Sri Lanka
 List of odonates of India
 List of odonata of Kerala

References

External links
 
 

Libellulidae
Odonata of Africa
Odonata of Asia
Insects of the Middle East
Insects described in 1817
Taxonomy articles created by Polbot